A Falcon 9 first-stage booster is a reusable rocket booster used on the Falcon 9 and Falcon Heavy orbital launch vehicles manufactured by SpaceX. The manufacture of first-stage booster constitutes about 60% of the launch price of a single expended Falcon 9 (and three of them over 80% of the launch price of an expended Falcon Heavy), which led SpaceX to develop a program dedicated to recovery and reuse of these boosters for a significant decrease in launch costs. After multiple attempts, some as early as 2010, at controlling the reentry of the first stage after its separation from the second stage, the first successful controlled landing of a first stage occurred on 22 December 2015, on the first flight of the Full Thrust version. Since then, Falcon 9 first-stage boosters have been landed and recovered  times out of  attempts, including synchronized recoveries of the side-boosters of the Falcon Heavy test flight, Arabsat-6A, USSF-44, USSF-67 and STP-2 missions. One of the Falcon Heavy center boosters landed softly but it was severely damaged during transport.

In total  recovered boosters have been refurbished and subsequently flown at least a second time, the leading boosters have flown 13 to 15 missions. SpaceX intentionally limited Block 3 and Block 4 boosters to flying only two missions each, but the company indicated in 2018 that they expected the Block 5 versions to achieve ten flights, each with only minor refurbishment. This milestone was first achieved by Booster B1051 on the Starlink-27 mission in 2021.

All boosters in Block 4 and earlier have been retired, expended, or lost. The last flight of a Block 4 booster was in June 2018. Since then all  boosters in the active fleet are Block 5.

Booster names are a B followed by a four-digit number. The first Falcon 9 version, v1.0, had boosters B0001 to B0007. All following boosters were numbered sequentially starting at B1001, the number 1 standing for first-stage booster.

List of boosters

v1.0 and v1.1 
These boosters were the first 2 major versions of the Falcon 9. The Falcon 9 looked very different from what it does today and it was much smaller and had much less power. On the maiden flight and second flight of V 1.0, SpaceX included basic recovery hardware (parachutes) to try and recover the booster. However, as the boosters broke up on re-entry due to aerodynamic forces both times, SpaceX gave up on parachutes and decided to pursue propulsive landings instead. First came some controlled water landings, then came the attempts on the drone ship "Just Read the Instructions 1". None of these boosters were recovered or survived landing after an orbital launch. Two test devices made several short flights each.

Full Thrust up to Block 4 
Falcon 9 Full Thrust (or sometimes called Falcon 9 version 1.2) was the first version of the Falcon 9 to successfully land. Changes included a larger fuel tank, uprated engines and supercooled propellant and oxidizer to increase performance. Five different versions of Full Thrust have been produced, Block 1 to 4 (all retired) are found in this list while the active Block 5 is listed separately. Block 4 was a test version that included new hardware like titanium grid fins later used for the next and final major version of the Falcon 9, Block 5. Flights of all Falcon 9 rockets up to Block 4 were limited to 2 flights only, with a total of 14 second flights of these variants. The boosters were either retired or expended after that second launch.

Since no data is provided, Falcon 9 boosters listed as simply "FT" (Full Thrust) denote Blocks 1 to 3, while Block 4 is listed as "FT Block 4". All boosters are Falcon 9 variants, unless otherwise noted. Boosters B1023 and B1025 were Falcon 9 boosters, which were converted to Falcon Heavy side boosters for the Falcon Heavy test flight.

Block 5 
There are three booster types: Falcon 9 (F9), Falcon Heavy core (FH core) boosters, and Falcon Heavy side (FH side) boosters. Falcon 9 and Falcon Heavy side boosters are reconfigurable to each other. A Falcon Heavy core booster is manufactured with structural supports for the side boosters and cannot be converted to a Falcon 9 booster or Falcon Heavy side booster. The interstage mounting hardware was changed after B1056. The newer interstage design features fewer pins holding the interstage on, reducing the amount of work needed to convert a Falcon 9 booster to a Falcon Heavy side booster.

Block 5 is the latest iteration of the Falcon 9 and Falcon Heavy boosters. Changes include a stronger heat shield, upgraded engines, new carbon composite sections (landing legs, engine sections, raceways, RCS thrusters and interstage), retractable landing legs, titanium grid fins, and other additions that simplify refurbishment and allow for easier reusability. A Block 5 booster can fly more than ten times. On 11 September 2022, during the Starlink 4-2 mission, B1058 was the first to complete fourteen launches and landings to become the fleet leader. B1052, first launched in April 2019 alongside with B1053, is the oldest and earliest launched of the active Falcon 9 boosters, and has completed 7 launches and landings as of 5 September 2022. Amongst all B5 boosters, B1058 is the booster with most spacecrafts (779) launched to orbit and along with the record for most spacecraft mass launched to orbit by a single booster, that is, of ~. , SpaceX used a total of 22 new B5 boosters, of which 11 are no longer active (five have been expended and six have been lost due to failed landings or being lost during recovery).

 means the booster has this logo on it. The logo is not being used in this table to signify that the booster is owned by NASA nor does it signify the booster is exclusively or partly used by NASA.
 indicates crewed launch under Commercial Crew Program (CCP). Adjacent logos are mission patches.

Statistics

Booster turnaround time 
This chart displays the turnaround time, in months, between two flights of each booster. As of April 2022 the shortest turnaround time was 21 days, for the sixth flight of B1062. Boosters that are still likely to be re-used (active fleet) are highlighted in bold and with an asterisk.

Full Thrust booster flight counts 
This chart lists how often boosters were flown. It is limited to the Full Thrust versions as previous versions were never recovered intact. The entries for Block 5 include active boosters that can make additional flights in the future. Blocks 1–3 made 27 flights with 18 boosters (1.5 flights per booster), Block 4 made 12 flights with 7 boosters (1.7 flights per booster).

Block 5 booster flight status 
This chart shows the current status of Block 5 boosters that have flown; how often they have flown and whether they are still active, expended (i.e. no attempt was made to recover) or destroyed (i.e. recovery of the booster failed).

Falcon 9 FT booster timeline 
This timeline displays all launches of Falcon 9 boosters starting with the first launch of Full Thrust. Active boosters that are expected to make additional flights in the future are marked with an asterisk. Single flights are marked with vertical lines. For boosters having performed several launches bars indicate the turnaround time for each flight.

Notable boosters

Booster 0002 Grasshopper 

Grasshopper  made its eighth, and final, test flight on 7 October 2013, flying to an altitude of  before making its eighth successful vertical landing. Grasshopper is retired.

Booster 1019   

Falcon 9 B1019 was the first Full Thrust booster, and was first launched on 22 December 2015 for Falcon 9 flight 20 and landed on the Landing Zone 1 (LZ-1). It became the first orbital-class rocket booster to perform a successful return to launch site and vertical landing.

SpaceX decided not to fly the booster again. Rather, the rocket was moved a few miles north, refurbished by SpaceX at the adjacent Kennedy Space Center, to conduct a static fire test. This test aimed to assess the health of the recovered booster and the capability of this rocket design to fly repeatedly in the future. The historic booster is currently on display outside SpaceX headquarters in Hawthorne, California.

Booster 1021   

Falcon 9 B1021 was the first booster to be re-flown and the first to land on a droneship. It was first launched on 8 April 2016 carrying a Dragon spacecraft and Bigelow Expandable Activity Module (BEAM) on the SpaceX CRS-8 mission and landed on an autonomous spaceport drone ship (ASDS). After recovery, inspections and refurbishing, it was launched again on 30 March 2017 for the SES-10 mission and recovered successfully a second time. This event marks a milestone in SpaceX's drive to develop reusable rockets and reduce launch costs. Following the second flight, SpaceX stated that they plan to retire this booster and donate it to Cape Canaveral for public display.

Boosters 1023 and 1025 

B1023 became the third orbital-class rocket to land on a droneship after launching Thaicom 8 into a geostationary transfer orbit on 30 May 2016. It was an unusually hard landing that broke the energy absorbers on at least one of the landing legs, causing the booster to "walk" across the droneship and lean over, but the rocket arrived safely at Port Canaveral. B1025 successfully launched the CRS-9 resupply mission on its maiden flight on 18 July 2016 and landed on LZ-1, being the first after B1019 to do so.

B1023 and B1025 were assigned the role of side boosters for the Falcon Heavy test flight in 2017, after which they underwent separate static fire tests. The boosters were mated to a newly built Falcon Heavy core, B1033, for the flight. The maiden flight of Falcon Heavy on 6 February 2018 launched SpaceX CEO Elon Musk's Tesla Roadster and a dummy astronaut into a heliocentric orbit passing the orbit of Mars. The boosters successfully separated from the core and performed a synchronized landing on LZ-1 and the adjacent LZ-2. B1023 is now on display at the Kennedy Space Center Visitor Complex in its Falcon Heavy side booster configuration.

Booster 1046   

B1046 was the first Block 5 Falcon 9, the final version of the SpaceX first stage. It was first launched on 11 May 2018, carrying Bangabandhu-1, Bangladesh's first geostationary communications satellite. This marked the 54th flight of the Falcon 9 and the first flight of the Falcon 9 Block 5. After completing a successful ascent, B1046 landed on the drone ship Of Course I Still Love You. After inspection and refurbishment, B1046 was launched a second time on 7 August 2018, carrying the Telkom-4 (Merah Putih) satellite. The Telkom-4 mission marked the first time an orbital-class rocket booster launched two GTO missions. This was also the first re-flight of a Block 5 booster. Four months after the Telkom-4 mission, B1046 arrived at Vandenberg Air Force Base to support the SSO-A mission. Following delays for additional satellite checks, liftoff occurred from SLC-4E on 3 December 2018. This marked the first time that the same orbital-class booster flew three times. Its fourth and last mission launched a Crew Dragon capsule up to the point of maximum dynamic pressure, where it separated to test its abort system in flight. After separation of Falcon and Dragon, B1046 was compromised by aerodynamic forces.

Booster 1048   

B1048 was the third Falcon 9 Block 5 to fly and the second Block 5 booster to re-fly, and the first booster ever to be launched four, then five times. During the last launch, an engine shut down seconds before the planned shutdown, becoming only the second time a Merlin engine failed since the failure during the SpaceX CRS-1 in October 2012. The primary mission was unaffected and the Starlink payload deployed successfully, further confirming the reliability of the rocket due to redundancy of the engines. With reduced thrust, B1048 was unable to sufficiently slow down its descent, and thus was unable to land.

Booster 1049   

B1049 was the oldest Falcon 9 booster on active duty until its last flight on Nov 22, 2022, after which this title went to B1052. It was the first to successfully launch and land six, then seven times, and the second to launch and land eight, nine, and then ten times respectively. It launched two commercial payloads, Telstar 18V and the eighth Iridium NEXT batch, and eight internal Starlink batches. B1049 has been seen with its landing legs and grid fins removed indicating that it will be expended on its next flight. The final flight of B1049 was originally thought to be O3b mPower 4-6 but a regrouping of the launches meant that an expendable booster was no longer required. It was then originally planned that B1049's last flight would be the launch of Nilesat-301 however, plans changed and the mission was flown with a recoverable booster (B1062.7). B1049 flew the Eutelsat-10B communications satellite on November 22, 2022. This mission was its last flight.

Booster 1050 

B1050 launched for the first time on 5 December 2018. A grid fin malfunction occurred shortly after the entry burn, resulting in the booster performing a controlled landing in the ocean instead of the planned ground pad landing.

No future flights for B1050 were planned, and it was scrapped due to its damage.

Booster 1051 

B1051 was the sixth Falcon 9 Block 5 booster built. On its maiden flight on 2 March 2019, it carried a Crew Dragon into orbit on the Demo-1 mission. It then flew its second mission out of Vandenberg AFB launching the Radarsat constellation. It then flew 4 Starlink missions and launched SXM-7, totaling 5 flights in 2020 alone, and becoming the first Falcon 9 to launch a commercial payload on its seventh flight. On 18 December 2021, it flew for a record 11th time. It was the first booster to be used eight, nine, ten, eleven, and twelve times respectively. It flew for the final time on 12 November 2022 for the Intelsat G-31/G-32 mission, and was expended.

Booster 1056 

B1056 first launched on 4 May 2019, carrying a Cargo Dragon to the ISS. Because of the failure of the static test fire of Crew Dragon C204's SuperDraco abort engines on LZ-1, it landed on a drone ship instead. It flew three more times. On 17 February 2020, B1056 was planned to perform the 50th orbital-class rocket landing, just 27 days after its previous launch. The booster soft-landed in the Atlantic Ocean and was severely damaged after launching Starlink satellites into orbit, becoming the first Block 5 booster to fail landing.

Booster 1058   

Falcon 9 B1058 was first launched on 30 May 2020, from Kennedy Space Center Launch Complex 39A (Apollo 11 launch site). It carried NASA astronauts Doug Hurley and Bob Behnken to the International Space Station. It was the first crewed orbital spaceflight launched from the United States since the final Space Shuttle mission, and the first crewed flight test of Dragon 2. It was the first crewed orbital spaceflight by a private company. The booster is the first and currently only Falcon 9 booster to feature NASA's worm logo, which was reintroduced after last being used in 1992. On 11 September 2022, it flew for the 14th time and became the first booster to be recovered 14 times. On 17 December 2022, it was also the first booster to fly and land for the 15th time.

Booster 1061   

Falcon 9 B1061 first launched Crew-1 to the ISS in November 2020, the first operational flight of Crew Dragon, and landed on a drone ship. It became the first booster to fly crew twice as well as the first reused booster to fly crew as a part of the Crew-2 mission. This first stage went on to complete additional missions. B1061 is the only booster to land on all of SpaceX's different landing zones and drone ships, except LZ-2.

Booster 1062  

Falcon 9 B1062 launched Inspiration4 in 2021, operated by SpaceX on behalf of Shift4 Payments CEO Jared Isaacman. The mission launched the Crew Dragon Resilience on 16 September 2021 at 00:02:56 UTC from the Florida Kennedy Space Center's Launch Complex 39A atop a Falcon 9 launch vehicle, placed the Dragon capsule into low Earth orbit, and ended successfully on 18 September 2021 at 23:06:49 UTC, when the Resilience splashed down in the Atlantic Ocean. B1062 currently holds the record for the fastest booster turnaround time at 21 days and 4 hours between 8 April 2022
(Axiom-1) and 29 April 2022 (Starlink Group 4–16) beating the previous record of 27 days and 6 hours held by B1060. This was the first time a booster had flown twice in the same month. According to the SpaceX webcast of the Starlink Group 4-16 mission, the booster spent just 9 days in refurbishment.

Booster 1069 
Falcon 9 B1069 launched SpaceX CRS-24 to ISS in December 2021 for NASA. SpaceX achieved the feat of 100 successful orbital rocket booster landings in this mission, coinciding with the 6th anniversary of its first booster landing. The rough seas led to the Octograbber robot not being able to secure the booster to the deck, leading to both the booster, dronseship and the Octagrabber robot being heavily damaged in transit. It took months for SpaceX to refurbish B1069, returning into service only on Group 4-23 mission in August 2022.

On its next flight for Eutelsat Hotbird 13F, B1069 included a hosted promotional payload by FIFA, that was a box powered by starlink containing 2 Adidas Al Rihla (the Journey) balls, that were to be used in 2022 FIFA World Cup in Qatar. These match balls were launched and brought back by landing on the droneship surviving the stresses of the booster. Later, they were taken out and shipped back to Qatar for the world cup. This was actually the first payload on a Falcon 9 booster and thus showed the ease of reusability. The balls' flight by SpaceX was, in part, a promotion for the company's Starlink satellite internet service. An associated website invited World Cup attendees to visit the Starlink office in Doha.

Reuse and recovery records
B1012 featured the first recovery attempt on a droneship on 10 January 2015. The attempt was unsuccessful.
B1019 became the first orbital booster ever to be recovered after a launch. After it landed at LZ-1 on 22 December 2015, it was retired and put on display at SpaceX Headquarters in Hawthorne, California.
B1021 became the first booster ever to land on a droneship. On 8 April 2016, B1021 touched down on Of Course I Still Love You marking SpaceX's second successful landing.
B1021 became the first booster to fly a second time, on F9 Flight 32 when it launched the SES-10 satellite on 30 March 2017. After its second successful landing, it was retired and put on display at Cape Canaveral Air Force Station.
B1023 and B1025 achieved the first synchronized landings when they touched down together at LZ-1 and LZ-2 respectively after the Falcon Heavy Test Flight on 6 February 2018.
B1046 (the first Block 5 booster) became the first to launch three times, carrying Spaceflight SSO-A on 3 December 2018.
B1048 was the first booster to be recovered four times on 11 November 2019, and the first to perform a fifth flight on 18 March 2020, but the booster was lost during re-entry.
B1049 was the first booster to be recovered five times on 4 June 2020, six times on 18 August 2020, and seven times on 25 November 2020.
B1051 became the first booster to be recovered eight times on 20 January 2021, nine times on 14 March 2021, and ten times on 9 May 2021, achieving one of SpaceX's milestone goals for reuse. It then became the first booster to be recovered eleven times on 18 December 2021 and twelve times on 19 March 2022.
B1060 became the first booster to fly thirteen times on 17 June 2022.
B1062 booster holds the record for fastest turnaround at 21 days. It launched on 8 April and again on 29 April 2022.
B1023 holds the record for the farthest downrange droneship landing from Falcon 9 at 681 km on 27 May 2016 and B1055 holds the record of 1236 km downrange from Falcon Heavy.
B1058 became the first booster to fly fourteen times on 11 September 2022.
B1069 launched and returned a hosted box containing two FIFA 2022 World Cup Adidas Al Rihla on 15 October 2022 for a sub-orbital flight, the first payload on a Falcon 9 booster.
B1058 became the first booster to fly fifteen times on 17 December 2022.
B1061 became the only booster on 30 December 2022 to land on all of SpaceX's different landing zones and drone ships, except LZ-2.

See also 

 List of Falcon 9 and Falcon Heavy launches
 Lists of spacecraft
 :Category:Individual Falcon 9 boosters

Notes

References

External links 
 Lists of SpaceX booster cores in Reddit and NASASpaceFlight forums
 Cape Canaveral Air Force Station on 25 Nov 2020 SpaceX successfully launches a Falcon 9 booster for a record seventh time

Falcon 9 booster
Falcon 9 first stage booster rockets
Falcon 9 first stage booster rockets